This is a list of people from Tonbridge, Kent, England.

Born in Tonbridge

Elias Allen (1588–1653), maker of sundials and scientific instruments
Timothy Allen (born 1971), photojournalist†
Harry Andrews (1911–89), actor
Anna Atkins (1799–1871), botanist and photographer
Edwin Bramall (1923–2019), soldier
Ron Challis (1932–2001), football referee
John George Children (1777–1852), chemist, mineralogist and zoologist
William Cobbold (1862–1922), England international football player
Sir James Darling OBE (1899–1955) Chairman of the Australian Broadcasting Commission
Marcus Dillistone (born 1961) Royal Premiered British film director, and music producer for the Athens 2004 Olympic Opening & Closing Ceremonies
Richard de Clare (1130–76), Earl
Neville Duke DSO OBE DFC (2 bars) AFC, FRAeS (1922–2007), World War II pilot and world air speed holder in 1953
Desmond Dupré, (1916–1974), lutenist and early music pioneer
Henry Fowler (1858–1933), educationist
Robin Hanley (1968–96), cricketer
Harold Langhorne (1866–1932), soldier
Shane MacGowan (born 1957), singer-songwriter
Cecil Powell (1903–1969), Nobel Prize Winner for Physics†
Reginald Punnett FRS (1875–1967) geneticist
James Reynolds (1866–1950), cricketer
Malcolm Simmons (born 1946) British Speedway Champion 1976–77 and former captain of England team
Ray Singer (born 19??), record producer
Johnnie Stewart (1917–2005), television producer
Walter Tirel (1065–1100+), nobleman
Sir Skinner Turner (1868–1935), chief judge of the British Supreme Court for China
James Welldon (1854–1937), Bishop of Calcutta
Sir Dick White KCMG KBE (1906–1983), intelligence officer
Claud Woolley (1886–1962), cricketer
Frank Woolley (1887–1978), cricketer
Ian Wynne (born 1973), Olympic canoeist
([Robert Smith]) (born 1981), Racing driver

Former Students at Tonbridge Grammar School

Old Juddians
These people attended The Judd School
Timothy Allen (born 1971), photojournalist
Fergus Anckorn (born 1918), magician and soldier
Luke Baldwin (born 1990), rugby player
Humphrey Burton (born 1931), broadcaster, presenter and director
William Cockcroft (born c1950), Chief Scout Commissioner
Rob Crilly (born 1973), journalist and author
Richard Dixon, British chemist, fellow of the Royal Society, and winner of the Rumford Medal
Neville Duke DSO OBE DFC (2 bars) AFC, FRAeS (1922–2007), World War II pilot and world air speed holder in 1953
Angus Fairhurst (1966–2008), artist
Taylor Fawcett, actor from Life of Riley
David Fulton (born 1971), cricketer
John Gathercole, (1937–2010), Archdeacon of Dudley
Max Godden, (died 2000), Archdeacon of Lewis
Tom Greatrex (born 1974), MP for Rutherglen and Hamilton West
Harold Hailstone (1897–1982), cartoonist and illustrator; brother of Bernard
Bernard Hailstone (1910–1987), artist; brother of Harold
Guy Hands (born 1959), financier
Donald Hodge (1894–2001), First World War veteran
Jack Holden (actor), actor
George Henry Horton (born 1993), filmmaker
James Kingston (born 2002>), winner of the 2023 national cross country championship
Terence Lewin (1920–99), First Sea Lord and Chief of Defence Staff
Sir Clive Loader KCB, OBE, ADC, FRAeS (born 1953), Air Chief Marshal
Rob Luft (born 1993), jazz guitarist and composer
Anton Matusevich (born 2001), British tennis player
Nathaniel Mellors (born 1974), artist & musician 
James Miller, (born 1976), British novelist and academic
Richard Moth, former Bishop of the Forces and current Bishop of Arundel and Brighton
 David Moule-Evans (1905–1988), composer
Mr Bingo (born 1979), illustrator
Geoffrey Paterson (born 1983), conductor
Cecil Powell (1903-1969), Nobel prize winner in Physics
Tom Probert (born 1986), cricketer
Martin Purdy (born 1981), Rugby Union player
Stuart Skeates, (born 1966), Major General and former Commandant of the Royal Military Academy Sandhurst
Tim Stanley, journalist
Rob Warner (academic), (born 1956), British academic
Michael Willard, (born 1938) cricketer
Ronald Williams (1906–79), Bishop of Leicester
Stewart Wood, Baron Wood of Anfield, Member of the House of Lords

Old Tonbridgians

People connected with Tonbridge
 Sir Adrian Baillie (1898–1947), MP for Tonbridge 1937–45
Hugh de Audley (1289–1347), English ambassador to France, was buried at Tonbridge Priory
Margaret de Audley (1318–47), baroness and countess, was buried at Tonbridge Priory
David Bartleet (1929–2002), Bishop of Tonbridge 1982–93
Brian Castle (born 1949), current bishop of Tonbridge
Margaret de Clare (1293–1342), countess, was buried at Tonbridge Priory
Ralph de Stafford (1301–72), nobleman, was buried in Tonbridge Priory
Richard fitz Gilbert (1030–1091), nobleman, built Tonbridge Castle
Richard Fitz Gilbert de Clare (died 1136), nobleman, founded Tonbridge Priory and held Tonbridge Castle
Philip Goodrich (1929–2001), Bishop of Tonbridge from 1973 to 1982
Jilly Goolden (born 1959), food critic, attended West Kent College
Arthur Griffith-Boscawen (1865–1946), MP for Tonbridge 1892–1906
David Halsey (1919–2009), Bishop of Tonbridge 1968–72
Victoria Hislop (born 1959), author, grew up in Tonbridge
Dame Kelly Holmes DBE (born 1970), Olympic athlete, attended Hugh Christie School
Richard Hornby (1922–2007), MP for Tonbridge 1956–74
Andrea Leadsom (born 1963), educated at Tonbridge Girls' Grammar School
Robert Norton (1838–1926), MP for Tonbridge 1885–92
Adrian Quaife-Hobbs (born 1991), racing driver, lives in Tonbridge
Sophie Rhys-Jones (born 1965), now The Countess of Wessex, attended West Kent College
Angie Sage (born 1952), author, attended Tonbridge Grammar School for Girls
Margaret Sharp (born 1938) peer, attended Tonbridge Grammar School for Girls
Brian Smith (born 1943), Bishop of Tonbridge 1993–2001
John Stanley (born 1942), MP for Tonbridge and Malling since 1974
Holman F Stephens (1868–1931), ran a number of railway companies from offices in Tonbridge
Paul Watson (born 1942), artist and documentary film maker, lives in Tonbridge
Paul Way (born 1962), golfer, attended Hugh Christie School
Gerald Williams (1903–89), MP for Tonbridge 1945–56
Russell White (1896–1979), Bishop of Tonbridge from 1959 to 1968
Jonathan Williams (born 1993), footballer for Crystal Palace FC, lives in Tonbridge
Bob Woolmer (1948–2007), cricketer, attended Yardley Court School

Notes

† also Old Juddian.

References

 
Tonbridge